Cleome platycarpa is a species of flowering plant in the cleome family known by the common names golden bee plant and golden spiderflower. It is native to the western United States from northeastern California to Idaho, including the Modoc Plateau, where it grows on clay and volcanic soils in the sagebrush. The stems are green tinted with purple, coated densely in glandular hairs, and lined with many leaves. Each leaf is divided into three small leaflets. The top of each stem is occupied by a raceme of many flowers. Each flower has generally four yellow sepals and four yellow petals around a center of many yellow stamens. The fruit is a flat, hairy capsule up to 2.5 centimeters long which hangs on the long, remaining flower receptacle. Found between 800–1200m.

Some Plateau Indian tribes used an infusion of golden spiderflower to treat children's colds, and rubbed on a mash to treat fevers.

The species is similar to Cleome lutea, but differs in the leaves and capsule shape.

References

External links
Jepson Manual Treatment
Oregon State University Photo Profile
Photo gallery

platycarpa